Leven Handy Ellis (April 6, 1881 – January 4, 1968) was an American politician who served as the 15th lieutenant governor of Alabama from 1943 to 1947.

Ellis was born in Nixburg, in Coosa County, Alabama. He obtained a B.Ped. degree from Troy Normal School in 1907, and a Bachelor of Law degree from the University of Alabama in 1909. Ellis practiced law in Columbiana, Alabama. He served as a state senator from 1927 to 1931, a representative in the Alabama Legislature from 1936 to 1943, and a mayor of Columbiana for two terms. In 1948, Ellis served as an Alabama delegate at the Democratic National Convention. After Hubert Humphrey's address, Ellis led 13 members of the Alabama delegation (that was also joined by the entire Mississippi delegation) in a walkout, leading to the creation of the short-lived Dixiecrat political party.

References

External links
Biography  by the Alabama Department of Archives & History

Lieutenant Governors of Alabama
People from Columbiana, Alabama
People from Coosa County, Alabama
1881 births
1968 deaths
Troy University alumni
University of Alabama alumni
Democratic Party members of the Alabama House of Representatives
Alabama Dixiecrats
Alabama lawyers
20th-century American politicians
20th-century American lawyers
Old Right (United States)